Spring Township is a township in Butler County, Kansas, USA.  As of the 2000 census, its population was 1,566.

History
Spring Township was organized in 1871. It was named on account of its numerous springs.

Geography
According to the USGS, it contains two cemeteries: Butts-Wakefield and Garrison.

The stream of Turkey Creek runs through this township.

Further reading

References

 USGS Geographic Names Information System (GNIS)

External links
 City-Data.com

Townships in Butler County, Kansas
Townships in Kansas